Rebinding is the renewal or replacement of the cover of a book.

Rebinding may also refer to:

 DNS rebinding, a method of manipulating resolution of domain names
 Rebinding, a change to the referencing identifier name binding in programming languages

See also
Bind (disambiguation)